For the Summer Olympics there are 31 venues that have been or will be used for swimming. The first venue took place in The Bay of Zea for the 1896 Games. Four years later, the events took place on the River Seine. They were part of events that were on the same venue as the 1904 Louisiana Purchase Exposition. By the 1908 Games, the first venue for swimming that was not in a lake or a river took place. It was not until 1920 Games that a separate venue was created for the aquatic events. The first venue where indoor swimming took place was after World War II at London in 1948.

References

 
Swimm
Venues